Payson Community Unit School District 1 is a unified school district composed of Seymour Elementary School  and Payson-Seymour High School, and is centrally based in Payson, Illinois, a village in Adams County; it serves Payson and the surrounding municipalities. The current superintendent is Rodger Hannel, while the principal of the Seymour High is Kirk Mosley and the principal of Seymour Elementary is Jeff Zanger. The athletics teams of Payson Community Unit School District 1 are known as the Indians and Lady Indians, for the boys and girls respectively.

Seymour High School goes by the nickname "SHS"; its school colors are blue and white.

References

External links

Education in Adams County, Illinois
Payson, Illinois
School districts in Illinois